Sister María Ignacia, OSC, born Bertilda Samper Acosta (31 July 1856 – 31 July 1910) was a Colombian Poor Clare nun, poet and writer. She was the daughter of José María Samper Agudelo and Soledad Acosta Kemble, both renowned writers and journalists of their time in Colombia.

Although most of her poetry has remained unpublished, she is known for her revision and expansion of the novena of aguinaldos, a popular devotional novena of Advent during the Christmas season in Colombia, also popular in Ecuador and Venezuela.

References

External links
 
 

1856 births
1910 deaths
People from Bogotá
Bertilda
Colombian Roman Catholic religious sisters and nuns
Colombian people of Scottish descent
20th-century Colombian poets
Poor Clares
Roman Catholic writers
Pseudonymous women writers
Colombian women poets
19th-century Colombian poets
19th-century Colombian women writers
20th-century Colombian women writers
19th-century pseudonymous writers
20th-century pseudonymous writers